The siege of Laodicea resulted in the Byzantine capture of the Seljuq Turkish city of Laodicea in 1119.

Background
Upon ascending the throne in 1118, the Byzantine emperor John II Komnenos was faced with the continued presence of Turks in Phrygia and along the Meander river. John planned to reconquer the city of Laodicea and led an army against it in the spring of 1119.

Siege
When the army reached the Byzantine city of Philadelphia, John built a fortified camp and sent a force under the Grand Domestic John Axouch to attack Laodicea. The city was defended by 700–800 Turks under the experienced commander Alp-qara. Somewhat later, John's army marched on Laodicea and built fortifications around the city. The city fell with little resistance.

Aftermath
John appointed a garrison and restocked the city with sufficient supplies. He then returned to Constantinople.

Citations

References

 
 

Sieges of the Byzantine–Seljuk wars
Conflicts in 1119
Sieges involving the Byzantine Empire
Sieges involving the Sultanate of Rum
1119 in Asia
1110s in the Byzantine Empire
John II Komnenos